"Shake That Monkey" is a song by Too Short featuring Lil Jon & the East Side Boyz, released in 2003.

Track listing

US CD:
 "Shake That Monkey" (clean) — 4:40
 "Shake That Monkey" (explicit) — 4:40

US 12-inch:
A1. "Shake That Monkey" (explicit) — 4:40
A2. "Shake That Monkey" (clean) — 4:40
B1. "Shake That Monkey" (instrumental)  — 4:40
B2. "Shake That Monkey" (a capella) — 4:40

Credits and personnel
Information from the vinyl single:
Producer: Lil Jon
Executive producer: Todd Shaw
Recording engineers: Ray Seay, John Frye, Asif Ali, and Ryan Dorn
Audio mixer: Ray Seay
Audio mastering: Chaz Harper

Charts

References

2003 songs
2003 singles
Too Short songs
Song recordings produced by Lil Jon
Jive Records singles
Crunk songs